Kwatle Satisha is a 2014 Indian Kannada-language comedy film directed by Mahesh Rao and starring Sathish Ninasam, Chikkanna, Anand, Suri, and Sonia Gowda. It is a remake of the Tamil film Naduvula Konjam Pakkatha Kaanom (2012).

Cast 
Sathish Ninasam as Satisha
Chikkanna as Chikkanna aka Chikka
Silli Lalli Anand as Ananda
Suri as Suresh aka Suri
Sonia Gowda as Dhanalakshmi aka Dhanu
Achyuth Kumar as Dhanalakshmi's father
Padmaja Rao as Dhanalakshmi's mother
Pratham as Prem
Suchendra Prasad as Doctor
Rockline Sudhakar as Suri's father
Hulivana Gangadharaiah as Satisha's father

Production 
The title of the film is based on Sathish Ninasam's character from Drama (2012). The film shot began at Maharaja's College, Mysore on 20 February 2013. The first look poster of the film featured Satish Ninasam in the Ghajini getup; however, the actor later clarified that the two films are unrelated.

Soundtrack 
The songs were composed by V. Harikrishna.

Release and reception 
The film was scheduled to release on 28 March 2014 on the same day as Ulidavaru Kandanthe but was delayed. A critic from Sify wrote that "Over all, Kwatle Satisha is a one-time watch with family as well as friends, but definitely a laughter riot!". A critic from Deccan Chronicle wrote that "Ninasum Satisha does a neat job and Sonia Gowda plays a sweet cameo as lead characters with Chickkanna filling the humour part". A critic from Bangalore Mirror wrote that "Kwatle Satisha makes for an engaging watch and should easily take care of a summer afternoon."

References 

2014 films
Kannada remakes of Tamil films
2010s Kannada-language films
Indian black comedy films
2014 comedy films